Vencill may refer to:

Kicker Vencill, American swimmer
13717 Vencill, main-belt asteroid